Elephant Revival is a folk music group from Nederland, Colorado, formed in 2006. The band consists of Bonnie Paine, Bridget Law, Charlie Rose, Dango Rose, Daniel Rodriguez, and Darren Garvey.

They refer to their style of music as "transcendental folk," because it transcends several musical categories and incorporates elements of Scottish/Celtic fiddle tunes, original folk pieces, traditional ballads, bluegrass, and indie rock. All members of the band are multi-instrumentalists and contribute vocals and to songwriting.

Individually and collectively the band members have performed with or opened for Dispatch, Bela Fleck, John Paul Jones, Devotchka, Michael Franti, Little Feat, Yonder Mountain String Band, Nickel Creek, George Clinton and Parliament Funkadelic, Leftover Salmon, Railroad Earth, State Radio, String Cheese Incident, Shanti Groove, Trampled by Turtles, and others.

History 
The band members originate from many parts of the country but have roots in both Colorado and Tahlequah, Oklahoma, Paine's hometown. Several members of the band began playing together in the summer of 2006 in various group combinations in Oklahoma and Colorado. The first show where all five members played together was in Colorado in October 2006 at the Gold Hill Inn, performing as Elephant Revival Concept. After solidifying the group, "Concept" was soon dropped from the name. Elephant Revival's debut, self-titled recording was released in 2008 and produced by David Tiller of Taarka. In summer 2010 Elephant Revival was signed to Ruff Shod Records, an independent label started by Chad Stokes of State Radio and Dispatch. Elephant Revival's second CD Break In the Clouds, also produced by Tiller, was released on November 22, 2010.

On June 17, 2016 the band narrowly escaped a bus fire the morning before a show at Music at the Mill in Hickory, NC. Several unique instruments and belongings were destroyed in the fire but the band members were unharmed and played the show that night with borrowed instruments and donated clothes.

On February 9, 2018 the band announced they would be taking an indefinite hiatus "due to family matters." Their farewell show was on May 20, 2018.

In fall 2020, Rodriguez announced that he would be releasing an album titled Sojourn of a Burning Sun, produced by bandmate Garvey. In interviews, he explained that the break-up of the band coincided with the ending of a romance between him and another band member.

Band members

Bridget Law - founding member (fiddle and vocals)
Sage Cook - founding member (electric banjo/guitar, acoustic guitar, mandolin, viola, vocals)
Bonnie Paine (vocals, stomp box, washboard, djembe, musical saw, cello)
Charlie Rose (vocals, pedal steel, banjo, cello, trumpet, trombone)
Dango Rose (double-bass, mandolin, banjo, vocals)
Daniel Rodriguez (acoustic guitar, electric banjo/guitar, vocals)
Darren Garvey (percussion)

Discography 
Elephant Revival (2008)
Break In The Clouds (2010)
It's Alive (EP) (2012)
These Changing Skies (2013)
Sands of Now (Live at the Boulder Theater CD & DVD set) (2015)
Petals (2016)

References

External links 
 

Musical groups from Colorado
Musical groups from Oklahoma
American bluegrass music groups
Culture of Boulder, Colorado